This is a timeline of the civil rights movement in the United States, a nonviolent mid-20th century freedom movement to gain legal equality and the enforcement of constitutional rights for people of color. The goals of the movement included securing equal protection under the law, ending legally institutionalized racial discrimination, and gaining equal access to public facilities, education reform, fair housing, and the ability to vote.

1947–1953

1947
 April 14In Mendez v. Westminster, the U.S. Court of Appeals for the Ninth Circuit rules that the forced segregation of Mexican-American students into separate "Mexican schools" was unconstitutional and unlawful.

1948
 In Delgado v Bastrop I.S.D., the Texas Attorney General decided that segregation of Mexican-American children was illegal.
 In Shelley v. Kraemer, the U.S. Supreme Court ruled that racially restrictive covenants violate the Fourteenth Amendment's equal protection clause and thus cannot be enforced by courts, though they may still be agreed to by private parties.
 The anthology series Destination Freedom premiers on local Chicago radio. This radio drama, produced by Richard Durham, will appear on Sunday mornings until mid-1950.

1950
 During the early years of the Miss America pageant, under the directorship of Lenora Slaughter, it became racially segregated via rule number seven that stated: "contestants must be of good health and of the white race.” Rule number seven was abolished in 1950.

1951
 In April 1951, students at Robert Russa Moton High School, a segregated "Colored" school in Prince Edward County Virginia, staged a student strike over poor conditions and racial segregation. That strike led to the NAACP filing Davis v. County School Board of Prince Edward County in 1952.

1952
 On behalf of Black parents and children, the NAACP filed five lawsuits against school segregation that challenged the legality of the 1896 "separate but equal" ruling in Plessy v. Ferguson. The five cases were Brown v. Board of Education, from Topeka Kansas, Davis v. County School Board of Prince Edward County from Virginia, Bolling v. Sharpe from Washington DC, Briggs v. Elliott from Clarendon County South Carolina, and Bulah v. Gebhart from Delaware. The five cases were later consolidated in the Supreme Court's Brown v. Board of Education ruling.

1954–1959

1954
 May 3In Hernandez v. Texas, the U.S. Supreme Court rules that Mexican Americans and all other racial groups in the United States are entitled to equal protection under the 14th Amendment to the U.S. Constitution.
 May 17In Brown v. Board of Education of Topeka, Kans. and Bolling v. Sharpe, the U.S. Supreme Court rules against the "separate but equal" doctrine, overturning Plessy v. Ferguson and saying that segregation of public schools is unconstitutional.
 July 27The Charleston, Arkansas school board unanimously votes to end segregation in the school district. Ending segregation for first through twelfth grades, the Charleston school district was the first school district among the former Confederate States to desegregate. The schools opened for the new school year on August 23.
 July 30At a special meeting in Jackson, Mississippi, called by Governor Hugh White, T.R.M. Howard of the Regional Council of Negro Leadership, along with nearly one hundred other black leaders, publicly refuse to support a segregationist plan to maintain "separate but equal" in exchange for a crash program to increase spending on black schools.
 September 2In Montgomery, Alabama, 23 black children are prevented from attending all-white elementary schools, defying the recent U.S. Supreme Court ruling.
 September 7 The District of Columbia ends segregated education; Baltimore, Maryland, follows suit on September 8.
 September 15Protests by white parents in White Sulphur Springs, West Virginia, force schools to postpone desegregation another year.
 September 16Mississippi attempts to abolish all public schools with an amendment to its State Constitution, but the amendment fails.
 September 30Integration of a high school in Milford, Delaware, collapses when white students boycott classes.
 October 4Student demonstrations take place against integration of Washington, DC, public schools.
 October 19Federal judge upholds an Oklahoma law requiring African-American candidates to be identified on voting ballots as "negro".
 October 30Desegregation of the U.S. Armed Forces said to be complete.
 Frankie Muse Freeman is the lead attorney for the landmark NAACP case Davis et al. v. the St. Louis Housing Authority, which ended legal racial discrimination in the city's public housing. Constance Baker Motley was an attorney for NAACP: it was unusual to have two women attorneys leading such a high-profile case.

1955
 January 15President Dwight D. Eisenhower signs Executive Order 10590, establishing the President's Committee on Government Policy to enforce a nondiscrimination policy in Federal employment.
 January 20Demonstrators from CORE and Morgan State University stage a successful sit-in to desegregate Read's Drug Store in Baltimore, Maryland.
 April 5Mississippi passes a law penalizing white students by jail and fines who attend school with blacks.
 March 2 15-year-old Claudette Colvin refuses to give up her seat on the bus to a white woman, eventually resulting in the Browder v. Gayle case.
 May 7NAACP and Regional Council of Negro Leadership activist Reverend George W. Lee is killed in Belzoni, Mississippi.
 May 31The U.S. Supreme Court rules in " Brown II" that desegregation must occur with "all deliberate speed".
 June 8University of Oklahoma decides to allow black students.
 June 23Virginia Governor Thomas B. Stanley and Board of Education decide to continue segregated schools into 1956.
 June 29The NAACP wins a U.S. Supreme Court suit which orders the University of Alabama to admit Autherine Lucy.
 July 11The Georgia Board of Education orders that any teacher supporting integration be fired.
 July 14A Federal Appeals Court overturns segregation on Columbia, South Carolina buses.
 August 1Georgia Board of Education fires all black teachers who are members of the NAACP.
 August 13Regional Council of Negro Leadership registration activist Lamar Smith is murdered in Brookhaven, Mississippi.
 August 28Teenager Emmett Till is killed for allegedly whistling at a white woman in Money, Mississippi.
 November 7The Interstate Commerce Commission bans bus segregation in interstate travel in Sarah Keys v. Carolina Coach Company. On the same day, the U.S. Supreme Court bans segregation on public parks and playgrounds. Georgia Governor Marvin Griffin responds that his state would "get out of the park business" rather than allow playgrounds to be desegregated.
 December 1Rosa Parks refuses to give up her seat on a bus, starting the Montgomery bus boycott. This occurs nine months after 15-year-old high school student Claudette Colvin became the first to refuse to give up her seat. Colvin's was the legal case that eventually ended the practice in Montgomery.
 Roy Wilkins becomes the NAACP executive secretary.

1956
 January 2Georgia Tech president Blake R. Van Leer stands up to Governor Griffin's threats to fire him, bar Georgia Tech and Pittsburgh player Bobby Grier over segregation.
 January 9Virginia voters and representatives decide to fund private schools with state money to maintain segregation.
 January 16FBI Director J. Edgar Hoover writes a rare open letter of complaint directed to civil rights leader T. R. M. Howard after Howard charged in a speech that the "FBI can pick up pieces of a fallen airplane on the slopes of a Colorado mountain and find the man who caused the crash, but they can't find a white man when he kills a Negro in the South."
 January 24Governors of Georgia, Mississippi, South Carolina, and Virginia agree to block the integration of schools.
 February 1The Virginia General Assembly passes a resolution that the U.S. Supreme Court integration decision was an "illegal encroachment".
 February 3Autherine Lucy is admitted to the University of Alabama. Whites riot for days, and she is suspended. Later, she is expelled for her part in filing legal action against the university.
 February 24The policy of Massive Resistance is declared by U.S. Senator Harry F. Byrd, Sr. from Virginia.
 February/MarchThe Southern Manifesto, opposing integration of schools, is drafted and signed by members of the Congressional delegations of Southern states, including 19 members of the Senate and 81 members of the House of Representatives, notably the entire delegations of the states of Alabama, Arkansas, Georgia, Louisiana, Mississippi, South Carolina and Virginia. On March 12, it is released to the press.
 February 13Wilmington, Delaware's school board decides to end segregation.
 February 22Ninety black leaders in Montgomery, Alabama, are arrested for leading a bus boycott.
 February 29The Mississippi Legislature declares the U.S. Supreme Court integration decision "invalid" in that state.
 March 1The Alabama Legislature votes to ask for federal funds to deport blacks to northern states.
 March 12U.S. Supreme Court orders the University of Florida to admit a black law school applicant "without delay".
 March 22King sentenced to fine or jail for instigating Montgomery bus boycott, suspended pending appeal.
 April 23U.S. Supreme Court strikes down segregation on buses nationwide.
 May 26Circuit Judge Walter B. Jones issues an injunction prohibiting the NAACP from operating in Alabama.
 May 28The Tallahassee, Florida bus boycott begins. 
 June 5The Alabama Christian Movement for Human Rights (ACMHR) is founded at a mass meeting in Birmingham, Alabama.
 September 2–11Tear gas and National Guard used to quell segregationists rioting in Clinton, Tennessee; 12 black students enter high school under Guard protection. Smaller disturbances occur in Mansfield, Texas, and Sturgis, Kentucky.
 September 10Two black students are prevented by a mob from entering a junior college in Texarkana, Texas. Schools in Louisville, Kentucky, are successfully desegregated.
 September 12Four black children enter an elementary school in Clay, Kentucky, under National Guard protection; white students boycott. The school board bars the four again on September 17.
 October 15Integrated athletic or social events are banned in Louisiana.
 November 13In Browder v. Gayle, the U.S. Supreme Court strikes down Alabama laws requiring segregation of buses. This ruling, together with the ICC's 1955 ruling in Keys v. Carolina Coach banning "Jim Crow laws" in bus travel among the states, is a landmark in outlawing "Jim Crow" in bus travel. The Browder case was brought and won by noted civil rights attorney Fred Gray.
 December 20Federal marshals enforce the ruling to desegregate bus systems in Montgomery.
 December 24Blacks in Tallahassee, Florida, begin defying segregation on city buses.
 December 25The parsonage in Birmingham, Alabama, occupied by Fred Shuttlesworth, movement leader, is bombed. Shuttlesworth receives only minor injuries.
 December 26The ACMHR tests the Browder v. Gayle ruling by riding in the white sections of Birmingham city buses. 22 demonstrators are arrested.
 Mississippi State Sovereignty Commission formed.
 Director J. Edgar Hoover orders the FBI to begin the COINTELPRO program to investigate and disrupt "dissident" groups within the United States.

1957
 February 8The Georgia Senate votes to declare the 14th and 15th Amendments to the United States Constitution null and void in that state.
 February 14Southern Christian Leadership Conference is formed; Martin Luther King Jr. is named its chairman.
 April 18The Florida Senate votes to consider U.S. Supreme Court's desegregation decisions "null and void".
 May 17The Prayer Pilgrimage for Freedom in Washington, DC, at which Martin Luther King Jr. gives his "Give Us the Ballot" speech, is at the time the largest nonviolent demonstration for civil rights.
 September 2Orval Faubus, governor of Arkansas, calls out the National Guard to block integration of Little Rock Central High School.
 September 6Federal judge orders Nashville public schools to integrate immediately.
 September 15New York Times reports that in three years since the decision, there has been minimal progress toward integration in four southern states, and no progress at all in seven.
 September 24President Dwight Eisenhower federalizes the National Guard and also orders US Army troops to ensure Little Rock Central High School in Arkansas is integrated. Federal and National Guard troops escort the Little Rock Nine.
 September 27Civil Rights Act of 1957 signed by President Eisenhower.
 October 7The finance minister of Ghana is refused service at a Dover, Delaware restaurant. President Eisenhower hosts him at the White House to apologize on October 10.
 October 9The Florida Legislature votes to close any school if federal troops are sent to enforce integration.
 October 31Officers of NAACP were arrested in Little Rock for failing to comply with a new financial disclosure ordinance.
 November 26The Texas Legislature votes to close any school where federal troops might be sent.

1958
 June 29Bethel Baptist Church in Birmingham, Alabama, is bombed by Ku Klux Klan members.
 June 30In NAACP v. Alabama, the U.S. Supreme Court rules that the NAACP was not required to release membership lists to continue operating in the state.
 JulyNAACP Youth Council sponsored sit-ins at the lunch counter of a Dockum Drug Store in downtown Wichita, Kansas. After three weeks, the movement successfully gets the store to change its policy and soon afterward all Dockum stores in Kansas are desegregated.
 August 19Clara Luper and the NAACP Youth Council conduct the largest successful sit-in to date, on drug store lunch-counters in Oklahoma City. This starts a successful six-year campaign by Luper and the council to desegregate businesses and related institutions in Oklahoma City.
 September 2Governor J. Lindsay Almond of Virginia threatens to shut down any school if it is forced to integrate.
 September 4The U.S. Justice Department sues under Civil Rights Act to force Terrell County, Georgia, to register blacks to vote.
 September 8A Federal judge orders Louisiana State University to desegregate; sixty-nine African-Americans enroll successfully on September 12.
 September 12In Cooper v. Aaron the U.S. Supreme Court rules that the states were bound by the Court's decisions. Governor Orval Faubus responds by shutting down all four high schools in Little Rock, and Governor Almond shuts one in Front Royal, Virginia.
 September 18Governor Lindsay closes two more schools in Charlottesville, Virginia, and six in Norfolk on September 27.
 September 29The U.S. Supreme Court rules that states may not use evasive measures to avoid desegregation.
 October 8A Federal judge in Harrisonburg, Virginia, rules that public money may not be used for segregated private schools.
 October 20Thirteen black Alabamians arrested for sitting in the front of a bus in Birmingham.
 November 28Federal court throws out Louisiana law against integrated athletic events.
 December 8Voter registration officials in Montgomery refuse to cooperate with US Civil Rights Commission investigation.

1959
 January 9One Federal judge throws out segregation on Atlanta, Georgia buses while another orders Montgomery buses to comply.
 January 19Federal Appeals court overturns Virginia's closure of the schools in Norfolk; they reopen January 28 with 17 black students.
 April 18Martin Luther King Jr. speaks for the integration of schools at a rally of 26,000 at the Lincoln Memorial in Washington, DC.
 November 20Alabama passes laws to limit black voter registration.

1960–1968

1960
 February 1Four black students sit at the Woolworth's lunch counter in Greensboro, North Carolina, sparking six months of the Greensboro Sit-Ins.
 February 13The Nashville, Tennessee Sit-in begins, although the Nashville students, trained by activists and nonviolent teachers James Lawson and Myles Horton, had been doing preliminary groundwork towards the action for two months. The sit-in ends successfully in May.
 February 17Alabama grand jury indicts Martin Luther King Jr. for tax evasion.
 February 19Virginia Union University students, called the Richmond 34, stage a sit-in at Woolworth's lunch counter in Richmond, Virginia.
 February 22The Richmond 34 stage a sit-in the Richmond Room at Thalhimer's department store.
 March 3Vanderbilt University expels James Lawson for sit-in participation.
 March 4Houston's first sit-in, led by Texas Southern University students, was held at Weingarten supermarket, located at 4110 Almeda in Houston, Texas.
 March 9An Appeal for Human Rights was published.
 March 15The Atlanta sit-ins begin.
 March 19San Antonio becomes the first city to integrate lunch counters.
 April 8Weak civil rights bill survives Senate filibuster.
 April 15–17The Student Nonviolent Coordinating Committee (SNCC) is formed in Raleigh, North Carolina.
 April 19Z. Alexander Looby's home is bombed, with no injuries. Looby, a Nashville civil rights lawyer, was active in the city's ongoing Nashville sit-in for integration of public facilities.
 MayNashville sit-ins end with business agreements to integrate lunch counters and other public areas.
 May 6Civil Rights Act of 1960 signed by President Dwight D. Eisenhower.
 May 28William Robert Ming and Hubert Delaney obtain an acquittal of Dr. King from an all-white jury in Alabama.
 June 28Bayard Rustin resigns from SCLC after condemnation by Representative Adam Clayton Powell, Jr.
 July 31Elijah Muhammad calls for an all-black state; membership in Nation of Islam is estimated at 50,000 to 100,000.
 AugustRev. Wyatt Tee Walker replaces Ella Baker as SCLC's Executive Director.
 October 19King and 50 others arrested at a sit-in at Atlanta's Rich's Department Store.
 October 26King's earlier probation was revoked; he is transferred to Reidsville State Prison.
 October 28After intervention from Robert F. Kennedy, King is freed on bond.
 November 14Ruby Bridges becomes the first African-American child to attend an all-white elementary school in the South (William Frantz Elementary School) following court-ordered integration in New Orleans, Louisiana. This event was portrayed by Norman Rockwell in his 1964 painting The Problem We All Live With.
 December 5In Boynton v. Virginia, the U.S. Supreme Court holds that racial segregation in bus terminals is illegal because such segregation violates the Interstate Commerce Act. This ruling, in combination with the Interstate Commerce Commission's 1955 decision in Keys v. Carolina Coach Co., effectively outlaws segregation on interstate buses and at the terminals servicing such buses.

1961
 January 11Rioting in Athens, Georgia, over court-ordered admission of first two African-Americans (Hamilton E. Holmes and Charlayne Hunter-Gault) at the University of Georgia leads to their suspension, but they are ordered reinstated.
 January 31Members of the Congress of Racial Equality (CORE) and nine students are arrested in Rock Hill, South Carolina, for a sit-in at a McCrory's lunch counter.
 March 6President John F. Kennedy issues Executive Order 10925, which establishes a Presidential committee that later becomes the Equal Employment Opportunity Commission.
 May 4The first group of Freedom Riders, with the intent of integrating interstate buses, leaves Washington, DC, by Greyhound bus. The group, organized by the Congress of Racial Equality (CORE), leaves shortly after the U.S. Supreme Court has outlawed segregation in interstate transportation terminals.
 May 6Attorney General Robert F. Kennedy delivers a speech to the students of the University of Georgia School of Law in Athens, Georgia, promising to enforce civil rights legislation. It is the Kennedy administration's first formal endorsement of civil rights.
 May 14The Freedom Riders' bus is attacked and burned outside of Anniston, Alabama. A mob beats the Freedom Riders upon their arrival in Birmingham. The Freedom Riders are arrested in Jackson, Mississippi, and spend 40 to 60 days in Parchman Penitentiary.
 May 17Nashville students, coordinated by Diane Nash, John Lewis, and James Bevel of the Nashville Student Movement, take up the Freedom Ride, signaling the increased involvement of the Student Nonviolent Coordinating Committee (SNCC).
 May 20Freedom Riders are assaulted in Montgomery, Alabama, at the Greyhound Bus Station.
 May 21King, the Freedom Riders, and congregation of 1,500 at Rev. Ralph Abernathy’s First Baptist Church in Montgomery are besieged by a mob of segregationists; RFK as Attorney General sends federal marshals to protect them.
 May 29Attorney General Robert F. Kennedy, citing the 1955 landmark ICC ruling in Keys v. Carolina Coach Company and the U.S. Supreme Court's 1960 decision in Boynton v. Virginia, petitions the ICC to enforce desegregation in interstate travel.
 June–AugustU.S. Department of Justice initiates talks with civil rights groups and foundations on beginning Voter Education Project.
 JulySCLC begins citizenship classes; Andrew J. Young hired to direct the program. Bob Moses begins voter registration in McComb, Mississippi. He leaves because of violence.
 SeptemberJames Forman becomes SNCC’s Executive Secretary.
 September 23The Interstate Commerce Commission, at RFK’s insistence, issues new rules ending discrimination in interstate travel, effective November 1, 1961, six years after the ICC's ruling in Sarah Keys v. Carolina Coach Company.
 September 25Voter registration activist and NAACP member Herbert Lee is shot and killed by a white state legislator in McComb, Mississippi.
 November 1All interstate buses are required to display a certificate that reads: "Seating aboard this vehicle is without regard to race, color, creed, or national origin, by order of the Interstate Commerce Commission."
 November 1SNCC workers Charles Sherrod and Cordell Reagon and nine Chatmon Youth Council members test new ICC rules at Trailways bus station in Albany, Georgia.
 November 17SNCC workers help encourage and coordinate black activism in Albany, Georgia, culminating in the founding of the Albany Movement as a formal coalition.
 November 22Three high school students from Chatmon's Youth Council were arrested after using "positive actions" by walking into white sections of the Albany bus station.
 November 22Albany State College students Bertha Gober and Blanton Hall were arrested after entering the white waiting room of the Albany Trailways station.
 December 10Freedom Riders from Atlanta, SNCC leader J. Charles Jones, and Albany State student Bertha Gober are arrested at Albany Union Railway Terminal, sparking mass demonstrations, with hundreds of protesters arrested over the next five days.
 December 11–15Five hundred protesters arrested in Albany, Georgia.
 December 15King arrives in Albany, Georgia in response to a call from Dr. W. G. Anderson, the leader of the Albany Movement to desegregate public facilities.
 December 16King is arrested at an Albany, Georgia demonstration. He is charged with obstructing the sidewalk and parading without a permit.
 December 18Albany truce, including a 60-day postponement of King's trial; King leaves town.
 Whitney Young is appointed executive director of the National Urban League and begins expanding its size and mission.
 Black Like Me by John Howard Griffin, a white Southerner who deliberately darkened his skin to pass as a Negro in the Deep South, is published, describing "Jim Crow" segregation for a national audience.
 An amendment to the Library Bill of Rights was passed in 1961 that made clear that an individual's library use should not be denied or abridged because of race, religion, national origin, or political views. Some communities decided to close their doors rather than desegregate.
 From 1934 through November 1961, the Professional Golfers Association of America maintained a "Caucasian-only" membership clause in its bylaws. The clause was removed by amending its constitution.

1962
 January 18–20Student protests over sit-in leaders’ expulsions at Baton Rouge’s Southern University, the nation's largest black school, close it down.
 FebruaryRepresentatives of SNCC, CORE, and the NAACP form the Council of Federated Organizations (COFO). A grant request to fund COFO voter registration activities is submitted to the Voter Education Project (VEP).
 February 26Segregated transportation facilities, both interstate and intrastate, ruled unconstitutional by U.S. Supreme Court.
 MarchSNCC workers sit-in at US Attorney General Robert F. Kennedy's office to protest jailings in Baton Rouge.
 March 20FBI installs wiretaps on NAACP activist Stanley Levison’s office.
 April 3Defense Department orders full racial integration of military reserve units, except the National Guard.
 JuneSNCC workers establish voter registration projects in rural southwest Georgia.
 July 10August 28 SCLC renews protests in Albany; MLK in jail July 10–12 and July 27 – August 10.
 August 31Fannie Lou Hamer attempts to register to vote in Indianola, Mississippi.
 September 9Two black churches used by SNCC for voter registration meetings are burned in Sasser, Georgia.
 September 20James Meredith is barred from becoming the first black student to enroll at the University of Mississippi.
 September 30-October 1U.S. Supreme Court Justice Hugo Black orders James Meredith admitted to Ole Miss.; he enrolls and a white riot in Oxford ensues. French photographer Paul Guihard and Oxford resident Ray Gunter are killed.
 OctoberLeflore County, Mississippi, supervisors cut off surplus food distribution in retaliation against voter drive.
 October 23FBI begins Communist Infiltration (COMINFIL) investigation of SCLC.
 November 20Attorney General Kennedy authorizes FBI wiretap on Stanley Levison’s home telephone.
 November 20President Kennedy upholds 1960 presidential campaign promises to eliminate housing segregation by signing Executive Order 11063 banning segregation in Federally funded housing.

1963
 January 14Incoming Alabama governor George Wallace calls for "segregation now, segregation tomorrow, segregation forever" in his inaugural address.
 April 3–May 10The Birmingham campaign, organized by the Southern Christian Leadership Conference (SCLC) and the Alabama Christian Movement for Human Rights, protests segregation in Birmingham by daily mass demonstrations.
 AprilMary Lucille Hamilton, Field Secretary for the Congress of Racial Equality, refuses to answer a judge in Gadsden, Alabama until she is addressed by the honorific "Miss". At the time, it was the southern custom to address white people by honorifics and people of color by their first names. Jailed for contempt of court Hamilton refused to pay bail. The case Hamilton v. Alabama is filed by the NAACP. It reached the U.S. Supreme Court, which ruled in 1964 that courts must address persons of color with the same courtesy extended to whites.
 April 7Ministers John Thomas Porter, Nelson H. Smith, and A. D. King lead a group of 2,000 marchers to protest the jailing of movement leaders in Birmingham.
 April 12King is arrested in Birmingham for "parading without a permit".
 April 16King's "Letter from Birmingham Jail" is completed.
 April 23CORE activist William L. Moore is murdered in Gadsden, Alabama.
 May 2–4Birmingham's juvenile court is inundated with African-American children and teenagers arrested after James Bevel, SCLC's Director of Direct Action and Director of Nonviolent Education, launches his "D-Day" youth march. The actions span three days to become the Birmingham Children's Crusade where over a thousand children and students are arrested. The images of fire hoses and police dogs turned on the protesters are televised around the world.
 May 9–10The Children's Crusade lays the groundwork for the terms of a negotiated truce on Thursday, May 9, which puts an end to mass demonstrations in return for rolling back segregation laws and practices. Dr. King and Reverend Fred Shuttlesworth announce the settlement terms on Friday, May 10, only after King holds out to orchestrate the release of thousands of jailed demonstrators with bail money from Harry Belafonte and Robert Kennedy.
 May 11–12A double bombing in Birmingham, probably organized by the KKK with help from local police, precipitates rioting, police retaliation, the intervention of state troopers, and finally mobilization of federal troops.
 May 13In United States of America and Interstate Commerce Commission v. the City of Jackson, Mississippi et al., the United States Court of Appeals Fifth Circuit rules the city's attempt to circumvent laws desegregating interstate transportation facilities by posting sidewalk signs outside Greyhound, Trailways and Illinois Central terminals reading "Waiting Room for White Only — By Order Police Department" and "Waiting Room for Colored OnlyBy Order Police Department" to be unlawful.
 May 24A group of Black leaders (assembled by James Baldwin) meets with Attorney General Robert F. Kennedy to discuss race relations.
 May 29Violence escalates at NAACP picket of Philadelphia construction site.
 May 30Police attack Florida A&M anti-segregation demonstrators with tear gas; arrest 257.
 June 9Fannie Lou Hamer is among several SNCC workers badly beaten by police in the Winona, Mississippi, jail after their bus stops there.
 June 11"The Stand in the Schoolhouse Door": Alabama Governor George Wallace stands in front of a schoolhouse door at the University of Alabama in an attempt to stop desegregation by the enrollment of two black students, Vivian Malone and James Hood. Wallace stands aside after being confronted by federal marshals, Deputy Attorney General Nicholas Katzenbach, and the Alabama National Guard. Later in life, he apologizes for his opposition to racial integration.
 June 11President Kennedy makes his historic civil rights address, promising a bill to Congress the next week. About civil rights for "Negroes", in his speech, he asks for "the kind of equality of treatment which we would want for ourselves."
 June 12NAACP field secretary Medgar Evers is assassinated in Jackson, Mississippi. (His murderer is convicted in 1994.)
 Summer80,000 blacks quickly register to vote in Mississippi by a test project to show their desire to participate in the political system.
 June 19President Kennedy sends Congress (H. Doc. 124, 88th Cong., 1st session.) his proposed Civil Rights Act. White leaders in business and philanthropy gather at the Carlyle Hotel to raise initial funds for the Council on United Civil Rights Leadership
 August 28Gwynn Oak Amusement Park in Northwest Baltimore County, Maryland is desegregated.
 August 28March on Washington for Jobs and Freedom is held. Martin Luther King Jr. gives his "I Have a Dream" speech.
 September 10Birmingham, Alabama City Schools are integrated by National Guardsmen under orders from President Kennedy.
 September 1516th Street Baptist Church bombing in Birmingham kills four young girls. That same day, in response to the killings, James Bevel and Diane Nash begin the Alabama Project, which will later develop as the Selma Voting Rights Movement.

1964
 All yearThe Alabama Voting Rights Project continues organizing led by James Bevel, Diane Nash, and James Orange. Although Bevel is SCLC's Director of Direct Action and Nonviolent Education, the organization itself is not yet participating.
 All year - Throughout Mississippi approximately fifty Freedom Libraries are established and run by librarian volunteers.
 January 23Twenty-fourth Amendment abolishes the poll tax for Federal elections.
 March 30 - Hamilton v. Alabama, 376 U.S. 650 (1964), is a United States Supreme Court case in which the court held that an African-American woman, Mary Hamilton, was entitled to be greeted with the same courteous forms of address which were customarily and solely reserved for whites in the Southern United States, and that calling a black person by their first name in a formal context was "a form of racial discrimination".
 April - The Chester school protests culminate in violent clashes with police in Chester, Pennsylvania.
 SummerFreedom Summer – movement for voter education and registration in the Mississippi. The Mississippi Freedom Democratic Party was founded and elected an alternative slate of delegates for the national convention, as blacks are still officially disenfranchised.
 June 9Bloody Tuesday – peaceful marchers beaten, arrested, and tear-gassed by Tuscaloosa, Alabama police on a peaceful march to the County Courthouse to protest whites-only restroom signs and drinking fountains
 June 21Murders of Chaney, Goodman, and Schwerner, three civil rights workers disappear from Philadelphia, Mississippi, later to be found murdered and buried in an earthen dam.
 June 28Organization of Afro-American Unity is founded by Malcolm X, lasts until his death.
 July 2Civil Rights Act of 1964 signed, banning discrimination based on "race, color, religion, sex or national origin" in employment practices and public accommodations.
 AugustCongress passes the Economic Opportunity Act which, among other things, provides federal funds for legal representation of Native Americans in both civil and criminal suits. This allows the ACLU and the American Bar Association to represent Native Americans in cases that later win them additional civil rights.
 AugustThe Mississippi Freedom Democratic Party delegates challenge the seating of all-white Mississippi representatives at the Democratic national convention.
 December 10King is awarded the Nobel Peace Prize, the youngest person so honored.
 December 14In Heart of Atlanta Motel v. United States, the U.S. Supreme Court upholds the Civil Rights Act of 1964.

1965
 February 18After a peaceful nighttime protest march in Marion, Alabama, state troopers turn off the streetlights, break up the march, and one trooper shoots Jimmie Lee Jackson. Jackson dies on February 26. Though not prosecuted at the time, James Bonard Fowler is indicted for Jackson's murder in 2007.
 February 21Malcolm X is assassinated in Manhattan, New York, probably by three members of the Nation of Islam.
 March 7Bloody Sunday: Civil rights workers in Selma, Alabama, begin the Selma to Montgomery march but are attacked and stopped by a massive Alabama State trooper and police blockade as they cross the Edmund Pettus Bridge into Dallas County. Many marchers are seriously injured, including SNCC leader John Lewis and long-time major Selma activist Amelia Boynton. This march, initiated and organized by James Bevel, becomes the visual symbol of the Selma Voting Rights Movement.
 March 9 Joined by clergy from all over the country who responded to his urgent appeals for reinforcements in Selma, King leads a second attempt to cross the Pettus Bridge. Although amassed law enforcement personnel are ordered to draw back when the protesters near the foot of the bridge on the other side, King responds by telling the marchers to turn around, and they return to Brown Chapel nearby. He thereby obeys a just-minted federal order prohibiting the group from walking the highway to Montgomery.
 March 11Rev. James Reeb, a white Unitarian minister who had heeded King's call for clergy to come to Selma, is beaten by Klansmen. Reeb dies of his injuries. Reeb's murder shocks the nation.
 March 15President Lyndon Johnson uses the phrase "We Shall Overcome" in a speech before Congress to urge passage of the voting rights bill.
 March 21Participants in the third and successful Selma to Montgomery march stepped off on a five-day 54-mile march to Montgomery, Alabama's capitol.
 March 25After the successful completion of the Selma to Montgomery March, and after King has delivered his "How Long, Not Long" speech on the steps of the state capitol, a white volunteer, Viola Liuzzo, is shot and killed by KKK members in Alabama, one of whom was an FBI informant.
 June 2Black deputy sheriff Oneal Moore is murdered in Varnado, Louisiana.
 July 2Equal Employment Opportunity Commission begins operations.
 August 6Voting Rights Act of 1965 is signed by President Johnson. It provides for federal oversight and enforcement of voter registration in states and individual voting districts with a history of discriminatory tests and underrepresented populations. It prohibits discriminatory practices preventing African Americans and other minorities from registering and voting, and electoral systems diluting their vote.
 August 11–15Following the accusations of mistreatment and police brutality by the Los Angeles Police Department towards the city's African-American community, Watts riots erupt in South Central Los Angeles which last over five days. Over 34 are killed, 1,032 injured, 3,438 arrested, and cost over $40 million in property damage.
 SeptemberRaylawni Branch and Gwendolyn Elaine Armstrong become the first African-American students to attend the University of Southern Mississippi.
 September 24President Johnson signs Executive Order 11246 requiring Equal Employment Opportunity by federal contractors.

1966
 January 10NAACP local chapter president Vernon Dahmer is injured by a bomb in Hattiesburg, Mississippi. He dies the next day.
 June 5James Meredith begins a solitary March Against Fear from Memphis, Tennessee, to Jackson, Mississippi. Shortly after starting, he is shot with a birdshot and injured. Civil rights leaders and organizations rally and continue the march leading to, on June 16, Stokely Carmichael first using the slogan Black power in a speech. Twenty-five thousand marchers entered the capital.
 SummerThe Chicago Open Housing Movement, led by Martin Luther King Jr., James Bevel and Al Raby, includes a large rally, marches, and demands to Mayor Richard J. Daley and the City of Chicago which are discussed in a movement-ending Summit Conference.
 OctoberBlack Panther Party founded by Huey P. Newton and Bobby Seale in Oakland, California.

1967
 April 4King delivers "Beyond Vietnam" speech, calling for the defeat of "the giant triplets of racism, materialism, and militarism".
 June 12In Loving v. Virginia, the U.S. Supreme Court rules that prohibiting interracial marriage is unconstitutional.
 In the trial of accused killers in the murders of Chaney, Goodman, and Schwerner, the jury convicts 7 of 18 accused men. Conspirator Edgar Ray Killen is later convicted in 2005.
 June - AugustOver 150 communities burn during the Long, Hot Summer of 1967. The largest and deadliest riots of the summer take place in Newark, New Jersey, and Detroit with 26 fatalities reported in Newark and 43 people losing their lives in the Motor City.
 October 2Thurgood Marshall is sworn in as the first African-American justice of the United States Supreme Court.

1968
 February 1Two Memphis sanitation workers are killed in the line of duty, exacerbating labor tensions.
 February 8The Orangeburg Massacre occurs during a university protest in South Carolina.
 February 12First day of the (wildcat) Memphis sanitation strike.
 April 3King returns to Memphis; delivers his "I've Been to the Mountaintop" speech in support of the workers.
 April 4Assassination of Martin Luther King Jr. in Memphis, Tennessee.
 April 4–8 and one in May 1968Riots break out in Chicago, Washington, D.C., Baltimore, Louisville, Kansas City, and more than 100 U.S. cities in response to the assassination of Martin Luther King Jr.
 April 11Civil Rights Act of 1968 is signed. The Fair Housing Act is Title VIII of this Civil Rights Act, and bans discrimination in the sale, rental, and financing of housing. The law is passed following a series of Open Housing campaigns throughout the urban North, the most significant being the 1966 Chicago Open Housing Movement and the organized events in Milwaukee during 1967–68. In both cities, angry white mobs had attacked nonviolent protesters.
 May 12Poor People's Campaign encamps on the National Mall in Washington, D.C. for six weeks
 October 16In Mexico City, African-American athletes Tommie Smith and John Carlos raise their fists in a black power salute after winning, respectively, the gold and bronze medals in the Olympic men's 200 meters.
 December 23In Powe v. Miles, a federal court holds that the portions of private colleges that are funded by public money are subject to the Civil Rights Act.

See also
 Timeline of African-American history
 History of civil rights in the United States
 Civil right acts in the United States
 Civil rights movement in popular culture
 Racism against African Americans
 Racism in the United States

References

Further reading
 
 Finkelman, Paul. ed. Encyclopedia of African American History, 1896 to the Present (5 vol. 2009).
 Hornsby, Jr., Alton, ed. Chronology of African American History (2nd Ed. 1997) 720pp.
 Hornsby, Jr., Alton, ed. Black America: A State-by-State Historical Encyclopedia (2 vol 2011)  excerpt
 Lowery, Charles D. and John F. Marszalek Encyclopedia of African-American civil rights: from emancipation to the present (Greenwood, 1992).

External links
 University of Southern Mississippi's Civil Rights Documentation Project
 Freedom Riders website chronology, extremely detailed
 Civil Rights Movement Archive movement timeline
 Civil Rights Timeline, sections on Martin Luther King Jr.
 Civil Rights: Pivotal Events – slideshow by Life magazine
 

 
 History of civil rights in the United States
civil rights movement
1960s in the United States
 Movements for civil rights